M.P. Majra  also known as MahmudPur Majra or Jahazgarh Majra is a village in the Jhajjar district of the Indian state of Haryana. It is part of the town of Beri tehsil. As per 2011 Census of India, the village had 822 households, with a total population of 4,090, of which 2,143 were males and 1,947 were females. Rohtak MP Pt. Arvind Kumar Sharma is the native of this village.

Transportation
The nearest Metro station on  the Delhi metro Green Line is located in the Devilal Park in Bahadurgarh 35 kilometres away and Najafgarh metro 55 kilometres away.

Railways
The nearest railway station is Jhajjar Station at a distance of 8 km. Other major stations close to Beri are: Rohtak  36 km; Bhiwani 55 km; Rewari  50 km;  and Delhi  60 km.

References

Cities and towns in Jhajjar district